Abraham Nava Valay (born 23 January 1964) is a Mexican former footballer who played as a defender. He obtained a total number of nine caps and no goals for the Mexico national team between 1991 and 1993, and was a squad member at the 1993 Copa América.

References

1964 births
Living people
C.F. Monterrey players
Club Universidad Nacional footballers
Club Necaxa footballers
1993 Copa América players
1993 CONCACAF Gold Cup players
CONCACAF Gold Cup-winning players
Mexico under-20 international footballers
Mexico international footballers
Footballers from Mexico City
Toros Neza footballers
Liga MX players
Association football central defenders
Mexican footballers